Brajarajnagar is a Vidhan Sabha constituency of Jharsuguda district, Odisha.
Area of this constituency includes Brajarajnagar, Belpahar, Lakhanpur block and Jharsuguda block.

Elected Members

Fourteen elections held during 1961 to 2019. List of members elected from Brajarajnagar constituency are:

 2022 By-Election: Alka Mohanty (BJD)
 2019: Kishore Kumar Mohanty (BJD)
 2014: Radharani Panda (BJP)
 2009: Anup Kumar Sai (Congress)
 2004: Anup Kumar Sai (Congress)
 2000: Anup Kumar Sai (Congress)
 1995: Prasanna Kumar Panda (CPI)
 1990: Prasanna Kumar Panda (CPI)
 1985: Prasanna Kumar Panda (CPI)
 1980: Upendra Dixit (Congress)-I
 1977: Upendra Dixit (Congress)
 1974: Prasanna Kumar Panda (CPI)
 1971: Upendra Dixit (Orissa Jana Congress), 
 1967: Prasanna Kumar Panda (Communist)
 1961: Prasanna Kumar Panda (Communist)

Election results

2022

2019 Election Result
In 2019 election Biju Janata Dal candidate Kishore Kumar Mohanty, defeated Bharatiya Janata Party candidate Radharani Panda by 11,634 votes.

2014 Election Result
In 2014 election Bharatiya Janata Party candidate Radharani Panda, defeated Biju Janata Dal candidate Anup Kumar Sai by 6,790 votes.

2009 Election Result
In 2009 election Indian National Congress candidate Anup Kumar Sai, defeated Bharatiya Janata Party candidate Suresh Pujari by 1,742 votes.

Notes

References

Jharsuguda district
Assembly constituencies of Odisha